R65 may refer to:
 R65 (New York City Subway car)
 R65 (South Africa), a road
 BMW R65, a motorcycle
 , a destroyer of the Royal Navy
 R65: Harmful: may cause lung damage if swallowed, a risk phrase